Ichthyoceros spinosus is an extinct pycnodontid that lived during the lower Cenomanian of what is now Lebanon.  I. spinosus had a triple, forward-pointing horn-like spine between its eyes, very similar to the single spine of Trewavasia, and a massive, multipointed spine emanating from the back of its head.  It was originally placed in the family Coccodontidae, but then was transferred to "Trewavasiidae" with Trewavasia.  Recently, it has been placed in Gladiopycnodontidae due to recent anatomical similarities with the various genera within that family, including Gladiopycnodus.

See also

 Prehistoric fish
 List of prehistoric bony fish
 Trewavasia, its close relative

References

Pycnodontiformes genera
Late Cretaceous fish
Extinct animals of Europe